Hudson Ralph Janisch (died 1890) was Governor of St Helena from 1873 until his death in 1890. He is the only St Helena-born governor of the island.

During his tenure as Governor, he was forbidden to reside at Plantation House, the governor's official residence, on economic grounds.

References 
 

British colonial governors and administrators in Africa
Governors of Saint Helena
1890 deaths
Year of birth missing